Carrancas is a Brazilian municipality located in the south of the state of Minas Gerais. The city belongs to the mesoregion of Campo das Vertentes and to the microregion of Lavras.  In 2020 the population was 4,049 in a total area of 728 km².  

Carrancas lies on a railroad line and is connected to the regional center, Lavras, by dirt roads.  The main agricultural products are sugarcane, coffee, bananas, and corn.

Geography 
According to IBGE (2017), the municipality is in the Immediate Geographic Region of Lavras, in the Intermediate Geographic Region of Varginha.

Ecclesiastical circumscription 
The municipality is part of the Roman Catholic Diocese of São João del-Rei.

See also
 List of municipalities in Minas Gerais
 Carranca

References

Municipalities in Minas Gerais